In chemistry, a triol is a chemical compound containing three hydroxyl groups ( functional groups), such as glycerol.

See also 
 chemical compounds with one hydroxyl group
 Alcohols
 Phenols
 Enols
 Diols, chemical compounds with two hydroxyl groups
 Polyols, chemical compounds with multiple hydroxyl groups

References

Functional groups
Triols